The South Cotabato Rehabilitation and Detention Center is a prison located in South Cotabato province, Soccsksargen region, Mindanao, Philippines.

Prison
A security check is performed in the prison on monthly basis called ′Greyhound operation′.

References

External links
 South Cotabato prison documentary on Youtube

Prisons in the Philippines
Buildings and structures in South Cotabato
Department of Justice (Philippines)
Crime in the Philippines
Koronadal